When You Remember Me is a 1990 American made-for-television biographical drama film directed by Harry Winer and starring Fred Savage, Kevin Spacey, and Ellen Burstyn. It is based on the life of Michael Patrick Smith, a young man who filed a lawsuit in the early '70s that led to improved conditions for nursing home patients nationwide.

Plot 
Mike Mills is a teen with muscular dystrophy, whose destitute single mother placed him in a state nursing home, where he contends with being a young person in the clinic and with an abusive head nurse, while Wade Blank started ADAPT, a grassroots national disability rights group in Denver in the 1980s.

Cast
Fred Savage as Mike Mills
Kevin Spacey as Wade Blank
Ellen Burstyn as Nurse Cooder
Richard Jenkins as Vaughan
Dwier Brown as John Harlen
Lee Garlington as Joanne
Ving Rhames as Leon
Dean Norris as Bill

References

External links 

 

1990 television films
1990 films
American television films
1990s English-language films
American films based on actual events
The Wolper Organization films
Films directed by Harry Winer